St. Luke's Senior Secondary School (SLSSS) is an English-medium mixed-gender Catholic school located on Mall Road, Solan, Himachal Pradesh, India admitting students from kindergarten to XII. It is owned and operated by the Shimla-Chandigarh Educational Society, a registered body headquartered in Chandigarh, in the Roman Catholic Diocese of Simla and Chandigarh. It has a current enrolment of about 2000 students. 

Founded in 1958, the school has been affiliated to the Central Board of Secondary Education, New Delhi since 1962. It is dedicated to Luke the Evangelist, and bears the motto "Gaudium In Veritate," meaning "Joy In Truth".

The session starts from mid February and ends in December.

History 
The school had its beginning with only 8 students in 1955 in Subathu, a cantonment area. It was named as Ephiphany School with Rev. Father Christanand as its founder. In 1957, the school was moved to Solan and housed in a rented building known as Badru-Khan House. 

In 1962 the school was granted permanent recognition due to the strenuous efforts of Rev. Fr. Emmanuel, who rendered his services to the school till 1973. After Fr. Emmanuel left, Fr. Persy took over as Manager cum Principal for a short duration. Fr. S.J.F. More joined as Manager cum Principal. Fr. More with his vast and solid experience of working in many reputed schools planned a spacious school building. However the project could not be materialized due to some financial constraints. Fr. More left for Bhopal in 1979.

In 1980, the vacuum left by Fr. More was temporarily filled by Dr. Fr. M.M. Mascarenhas who was called from Pune. He left St. Luke's in 1981. At that time Mr. Darryl Michael who was the headmaster of the school took over as the Principal and Fr. C.J. Alvares from Mangalore took over the charge as Manager of the school. It was under the able guidance of Fr. Alvares and unstinting work of Mr. Michael that the new school building was blessed by Rt. Rev. Dr. G.B. Rego on 14 June 1986.

It was in 1992, the bishop invited the Bethany Sisters to run the school following the departure of Agatha Thomas as principal. Sister Marceline with 3 other sisters took over the charge as Principal. Sr. Wilberta, who succeeded Sr. Marceline, worked tirelessly to upgrade the school to +2 level, and is credited as the mastermind behind making St. Luke's the Accredited Center for Open School.

A separate building for primary students was inaugurated by Rt. Rev. Dr. Gerald John Mathias. In 1997 the school was upgraded to +2 level.

Alumni
The alumni of St. Luke's are known as Ex-Lukites.
 Maheshwar Singh - Raja of Kullu and Former MP
 Rakesh K Jain - 1959-63 IRS (CE) 1976 batch, Ex Vice Chairman Settlement Commission and Former Chief Commissioner Nagpur Zone Now in Pune

School organisation

Principals and managers 

The current principal of the school is Sr Lavina Pinto and the manager is Rev. Fr. John Thatheus.

Managers
 Late Rev. Fr. C.J. Alvares (1979-1999)
 Rev. Fr. John Bosco (1999-2005)
 Rev. Fr. Amrit Lal (2005-2011)
 Rev. Fr. Biju (2011-2014)
 Rev. Fr. Stephens (2014-2020)
 Rev. Fr. John Thatheus (2020-2021)
 Rev. Fr. Praveen (2021- present)

Principals
 Late Rev. Fr. Emmanuel (1958-1973)
 Rev. Fr. Percy (1974-1975)
 Late Rev. Fr. E.F. More (1975-1979)
 Mr. Darryl Michael (1979-1989)
 Mrs. Agatha Thomas (1989-1992)
 Sr. Marceline B.S. (1992-1995)
 Sr. Wilberta B.S. (1995-1997)
 Sr. Ophilia B.S. (1997-1999)
 Sr. Grace Maria B.S. (1999-2002)
 Sr. Helen D' Costa B.S. (2002-2009)
 Sr. Alvina B.S. (2009-2011)
 Sr. Grace Maria B.S. (2011) (Officiating Principal)
 Sr. Tara B.S. (2011−2015)
 Sr. Isabella Agnes (2015-2020)
 Sr. Laveena Pinto (2020–present)

Buildings and grounds 
The school has 2 main buildings the Senior Block and the Blooming Buds Block (Junior Wing). The school has excellent infrastructure for games and sports. It has a well equipped Library, Science and Computer Laboratories. There are 3 main Grounds- The Assembly Yard, The Middle Ground and the Main Ground.

House system 
There are four houses which are named after great personalities.

 Ashoka House
 Gandhi House
 Nehru House
 Tagore House

St. Luke's Eco Club 
In a scenario where earth’s future isn’t clear, global temperature is surging, glaciers are melting, water level is increasing and the world is facing a crisis of sustainability, working for a greener tomorrow is the need of the hour. In this regard, St. Luke’s Sr. Sec. School founded the St. Luke’s Eco Club in the year 1995. Ever since, this club has worked tirelessly to spread awareness about environment-related issues. 
	The next milestone, in the journey of St. Luke’s Eco Club came about in the year 1999 when it got registered with the World Wide Fund for Nature, India and ever since, there has been no looking back. Eco Club has moved forward and worked towards building a greener tomorrow. 
	In its continuous quest for spreading awareness and respect for Mother Earth, our school, a registered member of Green School Programme at North Zone Level has been conducting several activities, through Eco Club, to sensitize the students towards environment. Our students have upheld the legacy to put in efforts for environment preservation and minimizing waste generation.
	The year 2021 proved to be a landmark year in the history of Eco Club. Not only did St. Luke’s Eco Club organize a whooping 15 activities all round the year, but also participated in several Inter-School Activities. Many Lukites made us proud by winning in National and State Level Activities.
The journey continues!

House council members 
Students are provided opportunity to be a part of the School Cabinet which acts like a bridge between the School Administration and the students. Every year the House Council Members are elected through a thorough analysis of the students academic record, personality and other values. An Interview is also conducted to select the best students among those who have applied for the various posts.

List of cabinet posts 

Core Cabinet: 
 School Prefects - Selected from Class XII
 Discipline Captains - Selected from class X - XII
 School Captains - Selected from Class X - XII
 Activity Captains - Selected from Class X - XII
 Sports Captains - Selected from Class X - XII
 House Captains (Two from each house) - Selected from Class X
 Also there are Assistant Cabinets which are selected from Classes  IX and X

Beside the Core Cabinet the school selects Cabinet Members from Blooming Buds too.

Events and activities

Sports and extra curricular activities 

The school believes in overall development of the students and thus along with academic result it focuses on Sports and ECAs too. 
There are various sports played in the school namely, Cricket, Football, Table Tennis, Badminton, Kho Kho, BasketBall and other athletic games. The school also organizes various Tournaments and Events to encourage competition in the field of sports.

Also to promote ECAs the school organizes various Inter-House Activities every week  Various Exhibitions are also organised specially on the days of Parent Teachers Meet. To make the students aware of the degrading environment the school has encouraged participation in activities like keeping the environment clean, plantation programmes, rallies etc.

List of tournaments and competitions organised 

 Lukite Inter-School Basket Ball Tournament
 Lukite Cup (Cricket)
 Lukite Cup (Football)
 Various Inter House Competitions-Debating Competition, Singing Competition, Dancing Competition, Flower Arrangement Competition, Cooking Competition, Quiz Competition etc.

The basketball team has participated and won at the CBSE Clusters and the State Level every year since 2011 and went to Nationals in the year 2014. Also, the cricket and football team has brought many laurels to the school.

Cultural events 
The school celebrates almost every festival and occasion. The celebrations include performances by the students like skits, songs, dances, speeches, etc.

List of major functions organised 

 Girl Child Day
 May Day
 Himachal Pradesh Day
 World Environment Day
 Independence Day
 School Founder's Day
 Award Ceremony- The most prestigious function which is organised annually in October/November
 Annual Function- The annual function is held after every two years.
 Athletic Meet
 Teachers' Day
 Children's Day
 Investiture Ceremony
 Farewell
 Christmas

Clubs and societies 
The students are given an opportunity to develop their hobbies and skills by forming various clubs and societies. Every week special activities are organised in each club and skills of students are developed. Various clubs and societies are The Knitting Club, The Eco Club, The Mechanical and Electrical Club, The Literary Society, The Dance Society, The Music Society, The Cooking Club, The Photography Society, The Drama Society.

Vocational Center and Open School 

In addition to the educational apostolate the school has also an extension programme for the less privileged women. Sister Zeena the pioneering member assisted by Sr. Wilberta worked very hard to start the St. Luke's Vocational Center.

Besides all this the school is also a study center for Open Schooling for the drop out students from all over the places.

Captain Sanjay Chauhan Memorial Award 
The Captain Sanjay Chauhan Memorial Award for the All Rounder in School is donated by Captain Sanjay Chauhan Foundation in the memory of Captain Sanjay Chauhan (Shaurya Chakra winner) and is awarded to a Class XII Student who outperforms the others across all the aspects like Academic performance, Sports, Personality, Character, Social Work, Leadership and Responsibility. This award is considered as the Most Prestigious Award of the School.

References

External link
 

Christian schools in Himachal Pradesh
High schools and secondary schools in Himachal Pradesh
Schools in Solan district
Solan
Educational institutions established in 1958
1958 establishments in Himachal Pradesh